PICMG 2.11 is a specification by PICMG that defines the electrical and mechanical requirements relating to  plug-in power modules in CompactPCI systems.

Status

Adopted : 10/1/1999

Current Revision : 1.0

References

Open standards
PICMG standards